The 2020–21 Boavista F.C. season was the club's 118th season in existence and the club's seventh consecutive season in the top flight of Portuguese football. In addition to the domestic league, Boavista participated in this season's edition of the Taça de Portugal, being eliminated in the fourth round. The club did not qualify for the condensed version of the Taça da Liga this season. The season covered the period from July 2020 to 30 June 2021.

Players

First-team squad

Transfers

In

Out

Pre-season and friendlies

Competitions

Overview

Primeira Liga

League table

Results summary

Results by round

Matches
The league fixtures were announced on 28 August 2020.

Taça de Portugal

Statistics

Goalscorers

Notes

References

External links

Boavista F.C. seasons
Boavista F.C.